Haad may refer to:

Haad Rin, a beach in Thailand
Haad Khuad, a beach in Thailand
Yamid Haad, Major League Baseball player
 Haad (company) Bosnian fashion company
 Haad, fictional Martian measurement in Barsoom

See also
Had (disambiguation)